James Aiono (born January 23, 1989) is a former American football defensive end. He was signed by the Indianapolis Colts after going undrafted in the 2012 NFL Draft. He played college football at Snow College and  Utah.

College career
Aiono appeared in 23 games for the Utes from 2010 to 2011 and finished with 12 tackles. Prior to his career with the Utes, he played junior college football at Snow College and was a 2008 first-team junior college All-American.

Professional career
After going undrafted in 2012, Aiono was signed by the Indianapolis Colts as an undrafted free agent. He was waived/injured on August 31, 2012, by the Colts and placed on injured reserve for the 2012 season and later released with an injury settlement on September 5, 2012.

External links
Utah Utes bio
Indianapolis Colts bio

American football defensive ends
American sportspeople of Samoan descent
Utah Utes football players
1989 births
Living people
Indianapolis Colts players
Players of American football from Anaheim, California
Snow Badgers football players